Drum line may refer to:

 Drum line (shark control), an anti-shark precautionary measure
 Drumline, a formation for a section of percussion instruments
 Drumline (film), a 2002 film

See also
 Drum (disambiguation)